They Thought They Were Free: The Germans 1933-45 is a 1955 nonfiction book written by Milton Mayer, published by the University of Chicago Press. It describes the thought process of ordinary citizens during Nazi Germany.

August Heckscher, the chief writer of editorials of the New York Herald Tribune, wrote that the book "suggests how easy it is for human beings in any society to fall prey to a dynamic political movement, provided their lives are sufficiently insecure, frustrated or empty." He stated that the book is simultaneously a discussion on ethics, on "how political tyranny is established", and on issues in Germany and the "German mentality".

Contents
In 1953, Mayer interviewed ten residents of a town, located in Hesse, Marburg, which the book calls "Kronenberg", to gauge how ordinary Germans felt about Nazi Germany. The real name and location of the town, of 20,000, which contains a university, are not disclosed. The town was controlled by the United States during the postwar period of occupation. The interviews occurred during Mayer's term at Frankfurt University's Institute for Social Research as a visiting professor. All ten were in the lower middle class. The author was not a German speaker and the men did not speak English.

The interviewees had the following occupations: baking, cabinetmaking, clerking at a bank, collecting of bills, police, sales, studying, tailoring, and teaching. Walter L. Dorn of the Saturday Review wrote that the interviewees were from a pro-Nazi bloc that was the "anti-labor, anti-capitalist, and anti-democratic lower middle class". The tailor had served a prison sentence for setting a synagogue on fire, but the others were never found to have actively attacked Jewish people. Mayer read the official case files of each interviewee.

The author determined that his interviewees had fond memories of the Nazi period and did not see Adolf Hitler as evil, and they perceived themselves as having a high degree of personal freedom during Nazi rule, with the exception of the teacher. Additionally, barring said teacher, the subjects still disliked Jewish people. Additionally Mayer found that he sympathized with his interviewees. Mayer did not disclose to the interviewees that he read their case files, nor that he was Jewish. Ernest S. Pisko of the Christian Science Monitor wrote "Had they known [that Mayer was Jewish] they would not have spoken frankly to him." Pisko concluded that therefore the relationship built by the author and the interviewees was on "false pretenses." At the time of the interviews the interviewees were still not in favor of the democratic Bonn government. Pisko added that the interviewees could have objected to political developments that came had they known they would come, but that they failed to foresee how Nazi rule would develop.

The end of the book describes how the post-World War II United States took a pro-militarization stance, in the context of the Cold War, after initially rejecting the idea of militarizing Germany.

Release
In 2017 the book was re-published with an Afterword by Richard J. Evans.

Reception
Hans Kohn, a professor at the City College of New York, wrote in his review that this work was "one of the most readable an enlightening" books written about Germany after 1945, when the Nazi government ended. Kohn agreed with the majority of Mayer's analysis of German history, though Kohn disagreed with Mayer's belief that militarism is inherently a problem in Germany.

Henry L. Roberts, writing for Foreign Affairs, described the book as "informal but in places penetrating and sensitive".

Dorn argues that the book is "certainly one-sided" and "pleasantly discursive, not unsympathetic". Dorn explains that the "muscular punch" comes from "scrupulous fairness and unsparing honesty."

Franz Adler of the University of Arkansas praised the "strong appeal" and "conviction" the book has are its "strength", although he criticized the small sample size and the fact that there was a language barrier between Mayer and the subjects. Adler also stated that there was "an abandoned freedom and high disregard for detail" in the translated material, originally from German, in the book.

Norbert Muhlen of New York City, writing for The Annals of the American Academy of Political and Social Science, praised how the author had a distanced, non-passionate view at looking at his subjects, although he criticized the small sample size from a particular rural town, which Muhlen compared to using a sample of people from "Middletown, Mississippi" to characterize the Democratic Party. Muhlen also criticized Mayer's analysis of the Cold War armament of West Germany, arguing that Mayer mis-characterized German newspapers' political stances.

In Books Abroad, Siegfried Wagener of Allenspark, Colorado argued that the book is "very readable and penetrating", though he argued that the interviewees "do not sound convincing" and are not "representative" of the entirety of German people, who Wagener argues "knew they were not free" although they still complied with the Nazi government.

In sum, Pisko stated that the book "is a fascinating story and a deeply moving one." Heckscher argued the book is an "important contribution".

Kurt H. Wolff of Ohio State University criticized the book for being "representative of the confused subject matter and its confused student."

References
 
 
 
  - Listed at OpenAire

Notes

External links
 They Thought They Were Free - University of Chicago
 Excerpt
 They Thought They Were Free: The Germans, 1933–45 - DeGruyter

1955 books
Books about Nazi Germany
University of Chicago Press books